Symmetrischema femininum is a moth in the family Gelechiidae, a family of moths usually referred to as twirler moths or gelechiid moths. It was described by Povolný in 1989. It is found in Argentina.

References

Symmetrischema
Moths described in 1989
Taxa named by Dalibor Povolný